In developmental psychology, the ontogenetic parade is the term introduced by Isaac Marks for the predictable pattern of the development of normal childhood fears: emergence, plateau, and decline.

References

Developmental psychology
Fear